The episcopate of the Catholic Church in Japan consists solely of a Latin hierarchy, joined in the Catholic Bishops' Conference of Japan.

It comprises sixteen ecclesiastical territories, called (arch)dioceses, led by residential prelate bishops: three archdioceses, led by Metropolitan Archbishops, whose ecclesiastical provinces of the Roman Catholic Church include a total of thirteen suffragan sees.

There are no Eastern Catholic, pre-diocesan or other exempt jurisdictions.

There are no titular sees. All defunct jurisdictions have current successor sees.

There is an Apostolic Nunciature to Japan as papal diplomatic representation at embassy-level in national capital Tokyo.

Current Latin dioceses

Ecclesiastical Province of Nagasaki 
 Metropolitan Archdiocese of Nagasaki
Diocese of Fukuoka
Diocese of Kagoshima
Diocese of Naha
Diocese of Oita

Ecclesiastical Province of Osaka 
 Metropolitan Archdiocese of Osaka
Diocese of Hiroshima
Diocese of Kyoto
Diocese of Nagoya
Diocese of Takamatsu

Ecclesiastical Province of Tokyo 
 Metropolitan Archdiocese of Tokyo
Diocese of Niigata
Diocese of Saitama
Diocese of Sapporo
Diocese of Sendai
Diocese of Yokohama

See also 
 List of Catholic dioceses (structured view)
 Catholicism in Japan

Sources and external links 
 GCatholic - data for all sections
 Catholic Hierarchy Profile of the Catholic Church in Japan
 Map of Japan by Diocese

Japan
Japan religion-related lists